Özerk is a Turkish surname and male given name formed by the combination of the Turkish words öz ("gist; kernel") and erk ("power", "authority", "validity") and may refer to:
 Kamil Özerk (born 1954), Norwegian-Turkish Cypriot professor of pedagogy

References

Turkish-language surnames
Turkish masculine given names